Tommy Kinman (13 July 1875 – 22 November 1941) was an Australian rules footballer who played with Carlton in the Victorian Football League (VFL).

Notes

External links 

Tommy Kinman's profile at Blueseum

1875 births
1941 deaths
Australian rules footballers from Melbourne
Carlton Football Club players